Music for a While (established 2004 in Oslo, Norway) is a Norwegian kabaret ensemble led by Norway's uncrowned queen of cabaret, Tora Augestad.

Biography 

Their music is obtained from the cabaret, baroque and church music repertoire, with elements of jazz. They present different musical styles with a very distinctive sound.

Music for a While released their debut album Weill Variations (2007). The follow up album Graces that refrain (2012) received critical acclaim. It was accompanied by a tour in Norway. Their third release was the album Canticles of Winter (2014).

Band members 

Tora Augestad - vocals
Mathias Eick - trumpet
Stian Carstensen - accordion, banjo and pedal steel guitar
Martin Taxt - tuba
Pål Hausken - drums

Discography 

2007: Weill Variations (Grappa Music)
2012: Graces That Refrain (Grappa Music)
2014: Canticles of Winter (Grappa Music)

References

External links

Music for a While: Come Again (live) - EnergiMølla on Yahoo

Norwegian classical music groups
Norwegian jazz ensembles
Musical groups established in 2004
2004 establishments in Norway
Musical groups from Oslo